Kevin Deshawn Thompson (born September 18, 1979) is a former professional baseball outfielder.

Early life
Thompson played Little League with the Benbrook youth league and graduated with honors from Western Hills High School, where he played baseball and football.  Thompson graduated from the University of Texas at Arlington with his Bachelor of Business Administration degree in Finance as of May 2011.

Career
He was selected in the 18th round (529th overall) of the  amateur entry draft by the Minnesota Twins.

He was a South Atlantic League All-Star selection in 2002 and a Florida State League All-Star in 2003.  Injuries plagued his 2004 season, however, he went to the Arizona Fall League and excelled.  Hitting .320 with 5 home runs, he was nominated to Arizona Fall League All-Prospects team in 2004.

He won the Yankees' minor league player of the year award for the  season, when he played with the Yankees' Double-A affiliate, the Trenton Thunder and the Triple-A affiliate, the Columbus Clippers. He made his major league debut on June 3, as a member of the Yankees, getting his first major league hit in the game.

2007
On April 8, he was called up because of Hideki Matsui's injury. He had a two-RBI double in his first at bat of the season against the Twins off of Dennys Reyes. On September 1, the Yankees designated Thompson for assignment, and he was claimed off waivers by the Oakland Athletics on September 7. He was later claimed off waivers by the Pittsburgh Pirates on October 15.

2008
Thompson started  with the Pirates' Triple-A affiliate, the Indianapolis Indians, but was released due to hand surgery on June 25.

2009
Thompson has signed with the Newark Bears of the independent Atlantic League of Professional Baseball. On September 4, 2009 Thompson Signed A minor league contract with the Texas Rangers.

2010
Thompson played for the Fort Worth Cats of the American Association. He was released by them on February 10, 2011.

2011
Thompson joined the Grand Prairie AirHogs of the American Association of Independent Professional Baseball for the 2011 season.

References

External links

1979 births
Living people
New York Yankees players
Oakland Athletics players
African-American baseball players
Baseball players from Fort Worth, Texas
Major League Baseball outfielders
Gulf Coast Yankees players
Staten Island Yankees players
Tampa Yankees players
Greensboro Bats players
Trenton Thunder players
Columbus Clippers players
Grayson Vikings baseball players
Scranton/Wilkes-Barre Yankees players
Indianapolis Indians players
Oklahoma City RedHawks players
Newark Bears players
Fort Worth Cats players
St. Paul Saints players
Grand Prairie AirHogs players
Águilas de Mexicali players
American expatriate baseball players in Mexico
Grand Canyon Rafters players
21st-century African-American sportspeople
20th-century African-American sportspeople